Puddin Mountain is a summit in Lemhi County, Idaho, in the United States.

The mountain was named in honor of Puddin River Wilson, a tavern owner.

References

Mountains of Lemhi County, Idaho
Mountains of Idaho